Enrico Bacchin (born 28 November 1992) is a retired Italian rugby union player who played as a centre and he represented Italy on 5 occasions, in 2015.
On 10 September 2015, he was named in the squad for the 2015 Rugby World Cup in substitution of Luca Morisi.

Born in San Dona di Piave, Enrico played locally for San Dona rugby club, which is known for its youth academy. Later he joined the first team, of which in his first year, the club achieved promotion to the National Championship of Excellence. The next season, he transferred to Mogliano, later gaining a permit to Treviso. The next season, he joined Benetton Treviso, along with fellow San Dona team members Amar Kudin and Matteo Zanusso.
From 2014 to 2016, he played for Benetton Treviso in the Pro14.

References

External links
 https://web.archive.org/web/20141129021106/http://www.benettonrugby.it/c1_118/bacchin_enrico.ashx
 http://www.itsrugby.co.uk/player-27253.html
 https://web.archive.org/web/20141222050333/http://www.pro12rugby.com/teams/benetton/squad.php?player=114021&includeref=dynamic
 http://www.espn.co.uk/italy/rugby/player/202889.html

1992 births
Italian rugby union players
Living people
Benetton Rugby players
Mogliano Rugby players
Italy international rugby union players
Rugby union fly-halves